Basketball England (BE, formally England Basketball) is the governing body of the sport of basketball for England including 3x3 basketball. The organisation operates the English Basketball League for both men and women, as well as the England national team. The organisation was also involved in the establishment of the Great Britain team in December 2005, along with its compatriots – Basketball Scotland and Basketball Wales.

Whilst the organisation governs the British Basketball League, the country's elite and only professional basketball league, they are not involved in the day-to-day running of the league.
They also offer the opportunity to play basketball. 
The organisation was founded in 1936. It is a non-profit organisation which is an association of member clubs and players who elect an Executive Board to administer their affairs.

The Executive Board employ a number of professional staff to enable it to undertake its duties and achieve its aims.

The headquarters of the organisation is in Belle Vue, Manchester.

Logo
The logo changed in 2014.

See also
English Basketball League

References

External links

Basketball governing bodies in Europe
 
1936 establishments in England
Organisations based in Sheffield
Sports organizations established in 1936
Sport in Sheffield
Sports governing bodies in England